Derek Ward or Derrick Ward may refer to:
 Derrick Ward (born 1980), American football running back
 Derrick Ward (footballer) (1934–2011), footballer 
 Derek Harland Ward (1917–1942), New Zealand flying ace

See also
 Ward (surname)